, also known as Huai Ji, was a politician and diplomat of Ryukyu Kingdom.

Kaiki was a Daoist practitioner of Ming Chinese ancestry. He was appointed  by King Shō Hashi. He played an important role in the unification of Ryukyu.

In 1427, he dug the artificial lake  and constructed an artificial hill named  next to it. He then brought many flowers from China and planted on the hill.

References

懐機 (かいき)
懐機 - 朝日日本歴史人物事典

People of the Ryukyu Kingdom
Ryukyuan people
Sessei
15th-century Ryukyuan people
Ryukyuan people of Chinese descent